Gregory Michael Ruckman (born December 30, 1973) is an American rower. He competed at the 2000 Summer Olympics and 2004 Summer Olympics in Athens, where he placed 7th in the men's lightweight double sculls, along with Steve Tucker. Ruckman was born in Cincinnati, Ohio, where he became and Eagle Scout.  He graduated from Harvard University.

References

External links

1973 births
Living people
American male rowers
Olympic rowers of the United States
Rowers at the 2000 Summer Olympics
Rowers at the 2004 Summer Olympics
World Rowing Championships medalists for the United States
Harvard Crimson rowers